Howard Garrett, known as "the Dirt Doctor" (born 1947) is a radio talk show host and a leader of the Organic movement.  He is a health activist, arborist, newspaper columnist and organic activist living in Dallas, Texas. He received his Bachelor of Science degree in Park Administration and Landscape Architecture from Texas Tech University in 1969. After serving in the U.S. Marine Corps Reserve, Garrett worked at Club Corporation of America, where he was a laborer and assistant golf course superintendent.

Garrett promotes natural organic programs and products. He opposes the use of synthetic fertilizers and toxic chemical pest control products, as well as criticizing some organic products that he believes do not work. He thinks that homeowners, nurseries and landscape companies underestimate the dangers of non-organic solutions, and consults with commercial properties wanting to convert to organic techniques. His philosophy is that the natural organic program works better - in every way. It, for example, save 40 -50% on irrigation.

He has written about the plant-derived insecticide Pyrethrum, which is made from the painted daisy (Chrysanthemum cinerariaefolium or Chrysanthemum coccineum that contain pyrethrin organic compounds which are potent natural insecticides.)  One of the common extra ingredients is PBO, which is a synthetic synergist that gives the basic insecticide more killing power.  Garrett agrees with the viewpoint of the Journal of Pesticide Reform, which says that in laboratory tests, insecticides made from pyrethrum have: caused tumors in animals; increased the risk of leukemia; disrupted the normal function of sex steroids; and triggered allergic reactions including heart attack and asthma.

Garrett has been the topic in numerous magazines and articles.

Garrett runs a website giving information about his approach, and sends out a weekly newsletter to an audience of over 100,000.

Bio
Howard Garrett
Past member American Society of Landscape Architects – ASLA
Arborist - International Society of Arboriculture – ISA.
Nationally syndicated radio talk show host — Salem Radio Network,
Columnist for the Dallas Morning News - Organic Answers,
Author of 15 books
Chairman of Texas Organic Research Center (TORC) a 501(c)3 corporation,
Past member of the Organic Advisory Board Texas Department of Agriculture
Presenter of the Natural Organic Certification on-line TORC Course

Books by Howard Garrett

 Organic Manual (Multiple revisions 2002 - 2016)
 Texas Gardening the Natural Way: The Complete Handbook (Revised February 2016)
 Organic Lawn Care (June 2014)
 Organic Management for the Professional (2012)
 Plants for Houston and the Gulf Coast (March 2008)
 Texas Tree Book October (2002)
 Texas Herb Book (January 2001)
 Texas Bug Book (March 1999)
 Howard Garrett’s Texas Organic Gardening (June 1998)
 Organic Vegetable & Edible Landscaping (October 1998)
 The Dirt Doctor’s Guide to Organic Gardening (1995)
 Texas Organic Gardening Book (1993)
 J. Howard Garrett's Plants of Texas I.D. Swatcher (1990)
 Landscape Design - Texas Style (October 1986)
 Plants of the Metroplex(Revised multiple times 1974 - 1998)

References

External links
 Official website

Living people
1947 births
Organic gardeners
The Dallas Morning News people